Adán Gordón (21 January 1906 – 8 March 1966) was a Panamanian swimmer. He competed in two events at the 1928 Summer Olympics.

References

External links
 

1906 births
1966 deaths
People from Taboga District
Panamanian male swimmers
Olympic swimmers of Panama
Swimmers at the 1928 Summer Olympics
Place of death missing
20th-century Panamanian people